Marc Serrahima Castellà (born 25 April 1995) is a Spanish field hockey player who plays as a defender for Dutch club HGC and the Spanish national team.  Hi is son of Mireia Castellà (former tennis player) and his great-uncle is Joan Serrahima, participant in the 1928 Amsterdam Games and the first 100-meter Spanish champion born in Catalonia. His four younger siblings (Mariona, Anna, Berta, Oriol) are also professional field hockey players.

Club career
Serrahima played for Junior FC Sport & Spa in Spain and in June 2020 it was announced he joined HGC in the Dutch Hoofdklasse for the 2020–21 season.

International career
Serrahima made his debut for the senior national team in June 2017 in a test match against Belgium. He represented Spain at the 2018 World Cup.

References

External links

1995 births
Living people
Spanish male field hockey players
Male field hockey defenders
2018 Men's Hockey World Cup players
División de Honor de Hockey Hierba players
HGC players
Men's Hoofdklasse Hockey players